Diana White may refer to:

 Diana White (dancer), New York City Ballet dancer
 Diana White (artist) (1868–1950), British artist and translator